Dry Brook is a river in Delaware County, New York. It flows into Elk Creek northeast of Delhi.

References

Rivers of New York (state)
Rivers of Delaware County, New York